Fatma Betül Sayan Kaya (born January 31, 1981) is a Turkish politician who serves as the Minister of Family and Social Policies since 24 May 2016. Sayan Kaya is the vice-chair of the Justice and Development Party (AKP) responsible for foreign affairs.

She is a Member of Parliament for Istanbul second electoral district from the AKP.

Fatma Betül Sayan graduated from Bilkent University department of computer engineering with high distinction. She completed her MD degree in Cerrahpaşa Medical School of Istanbul University. Between 2009 and 2012, she served as an advisor to Recep Tayyip Erdoğan. In 2017 she was involved in a diplomatic row between the Netherlands and Turkey, during which she was denied from campaigning in the Netherlands for the 2017 Turkish constitutional referendum.

Fatma Betül Sayan Kaya is married and has two children.

References

External links 
 Official Website
 

Living people
1981 births
People from Fatih
Turkish engineers
Computer engineers
Justice and Development Party (Turkey) politicians
Members of the 26th Parliament of Turkey
Members of the 65th government of Turkey
Bilkent University alumni
Istanbul University Cerrahpaşa Faculty of Medicine alumni
Beyoğlu Anatolian High School alumni
Women government ministers of Turkey
Government ministers of Turkey
21st-century Turkish physicians
Ministers of Family and Social Policy of Turkey